This is a timeline of the Anglophone Crisis in Cameroon during 2023.

The Anglophone Crisis is an ongoing armed conflict in the Republic of Cameroon in Central Africa, where historically English-speaking Ambazonian separatists are seeking the independence of the former British trust territory of Southern Cameroons, which was unified with Cameroon since 1961.

January
 On January 1-2, following President Paul Biya's announcement in his New Years' speech that the Cameroonian military was crushing the Ambazonian rebellion, separatists moved to enforce local lockdowns. The Cameroon Armed Forces announced that it had deployed scores of troops to Oku, Kumbo and Jakiri, Northwest Region, and claimed to have killed 11 separatists. The Ambazonia Defence Forces (ADF) announced that the separatists had expanded their territorial grip and that the war would continue.
 On January 4, a Cameroonian gendarme was killed by separatist fighters in Bamenda. The ADF claimed responsibility. In Bache, Akwaya, three people were killed and ten were injured in a separatist raid. The separatists accused the locals of assisting a Cameroonian raid on one of their camps a few days prior.
On January 5, locals in Ndoh Beach in Mbanga in Littoral Region complained that the army had effectively abandoned them, enabling separatists to attack the town with impunity. The Divisional Officer of Mbanga promised to reinforce security in the area. Separatist forces abducted 15 mourners in Ashong, Batibo subdivision in the Northwest Region.
On January 6, the 15 mourners who had been abducted on January 5 by separatist forces were released.
On January 7, Cameroonian forces invaded a burial and opened fire killing a masquerade in Bambui.
On January 9, a Cameroonian soldier was shot dead by separatists who then seized his gun in the Northwest Region.
On January 11, a man claiming to be commander Zami of the Ambazonia Restoration Force was killed by Cameroonian forces during a gun battle in Kumba.
On January 12, sporadic gunshots were heard in Mile 5 Nkwen in Bamenda. The exact cause of the clashes is unknown but some locals claim it is following an attack on a gendermerie road patrol element. In Gayama near the Nigerian border, clashes between separatists and armed Fulani herders from Nigeria left at least 12 people dead, including the traditional ruler of Munkep, his son, and four other civilians. In addition, at least 20 civilians were injured, and some houses were burned down. Days later, Cameroon sent at least 100 soldiers to Gayama; many civilians fled for fear of getting caught up in clashes between separatists and Cameroonian troops.
On January 13, following an attack on Cameroonian forces in Mile 5 Nkwen in Bamenda, Cameroonian forces moved to invade the area and set on fire several shops and motobikes. In Kumba, suspected separatist fighters killed a police officer.
On January 14, a military base around the Mamfe bridge was attacked and destroyed by separatist forces and several weapons and ammunations were taken away. One soldier was killed during the attack. In a separate incident, three soldiers were killed during a separatist improvised explosive device (IED) ambush in Mbengwi.
Between January 10-17, ten soldiers were killed in various separatist attacks, four of whom were killed in Bamenda.
On January 18, separatists killed an election official in Bamenda.
On January 21, the government of Canada announced that the warring parties had signed an agreement to enter a peace process facilitated by Canada. The agreement was signed by the Cameroonian government, the Ambazonia Governing Council (and its armed wing, the ADF), the African People's Liberation Movement (and its armed wing, SOCADEF), the Interim Government of Ambazonia, and the Ambazonia Coalition Team.
On January 23, in reaction to the announcement of a peace process facilitated by Canada, Communication minister of Cameroon, René Sadi says the Government of Cameroon has not mandated any peace mediator or facilitator. Suspected separatist fighters stormed Mamfe and set a Total petrol station on fire.
On January 28, General No Pity resurfaced in a video after he had been out of the public view for several months. He said that "three truck loads" of soldiers had attacked his stronghold in Bambalang two days prior, only to be repelled with heavy losses. In Mamfe, separatist fighters burned down the village of Eshobi, killed one person and abducted another five. According to locals, Cameroonian soldiers stationed at a base in Eshobi watched the attack, but did not attempt to intervene.
On January 30, an ADF general known as General Mbula (born Orock Valentine) was killed by a military officer during a special military operation at Ekpor in Upper Banyang.
On January 31, Cameroonian forces killed Ambazonian general Ayuk Ndifon Defcam (known as "General Transporter") and his loyal follower following a gun battle in Konye and displayed their corpses in public.

February
On February 1-3, separatists carried out a string of attacks in Bamessing, Oku, Nkambe, Kumbo, Kom and Nkambe, using IEDs. The Cameroonian military said that several civilians were killed or abducted, while some military vehicles were also destroyed. Ambazonia Restoration Forces commander Sagon Jaguar said in a video that his forces had destroyed five military vehicles in Bamessing using IEDs. Capo Daniel from the ADF said that separatists had increased their IED attacks to avenge the killing of "General Transporter" on January 31.
On February 3, suspected separatists shot and killed a man in Alakuma, Bamenda.
On February 5, three separatist fighters were killed and two Cameroonian soldiers were injured, one seriously during clashes in Baba I. In Bambui, Social Democratic Front (SDF) Member of Parliament Wainachi Nentoh Honourine was abducted by armed men, who went on to demand 36 million CFA francs for her release.
On February 10, separatists imposed a lockdown in Bamenda, which was largely respected by the population on the eve of the Youth Day celebration. Several explosions were reported in the town, for which the separatists claimed responsibility. In Tiko, six CDC workers were killed by separatist fighters for defying a separatist-imposed ghost town.
On February 16, a Cameroonian soldier was killed in a separatist attack against a Brasseries du Cameroun truck escorted by the army in Kumba. In Nkambé, a teacher was killed by separatist fighters for participating in the Youth Day celebration, five days ago.
On February 20, a teenager in Bali was beheaded by suspected separatist fighters, who accused her of revealing separatist hideouts.
On February 21, seven bodies were found in Ndop after a day of heavy battles between Cameroonian forces and separatists. The Cameroonian Army said 15 separatists had been killed in Ndop alone in February, and that at least 30 had been killed elsewhere in Northwest Region. The Cameroonian Army also said that 15 separatists had surrendered. The ADF said it had killed 38 Cameroonian soldiers since Paul Biya had announced the March 12 Senate election.
On February 25, ninetheen athletes were wounded in multiple explosions during the Mount Cameroon Race of Hope. The Ambazonia Defence Forces (ADF) claimed responsibility, saying that their primary target had been Cameroonian elite forces.
On February 26, separatists killed a driver and set his vehicle ablaze in Mmouck-Leteh in Lebialem.
On February 28, a woman victim of the Mount Cameroon Race of Hope explosions, that took place three days ago died at the hospital. She was severely injured alongside her three children.

March 
On March 6, it was reported that Cameroonian forces had raided and dismantled a separatist camp in Buea that had been led by "General Black Rapen", arresting a number of men and dismantling six IEDs.
In the days leading up to the March 12 Cameroon senatorial election, separatists blocked roads and carried out a string of lethal attacks against military vehicles. Battles were recorded in Tadu, Bamenda, Ndop, Wum, Jakiri, Oku, Bambili, Sabga, Mamfe, Menji and Tiko. The Cameroonian Army said that two dozen separatists had been killed, while acknowledging the loss of several military vehicles. The SDF said that the clashes had made it impossible for its candidates to campaign.

References 

Anglophone Crisis
Anglophone Crisis (2023)
Anglophone Crisis (2023)
2023 in Cameroon
2023 timelines